The Zytek ZRS03 engine is a 3.4-litre normally-aspirated V8 racing engine, developed and produced by Zytek for Formula V8 3.5, a series 1st-tier division for World Series by Renault. The ZRS03 was introduced on 24 August 2011. The ZRS03 engine running on Elf LMS 102 RON fuel.

Debut
The Zytek-Renault ZRS03's race debut was at the 2012 Aragón World Series by Renault round on 5–6 May 2012. DAMS's Arthur Pic won the inaugural pole and Nick Yelloly and Robin Frijns won the first race with the ZRS03 engine.

Starting from 2012 season, the Formula Renault 3.5 Series adopted a new engine; a 3.4 litre V8 engine producing 530 BHP at 9,250 rpm, and 330 lb-ft (440 N.m.) of torque at 7,250 rpm, developed by Zytek. The cars have 50 more horsepower than previous season's 3.5 litre V6 Nissan VQ35 unit; which produced 480 bhp, and had a rev limit of 8,500 rpm. and lost 15 kg (33 pounds) of weight.

Applications
Dallara T12

References

External links
Zytek ZRS03 Technical Specifications
World Series by Renault official website

Engines by model
Zytek engines
Renault engines
Renault Sport Series
Formula Renault 3.5 series
V8 engines